Water Wizz, touted as "Cape Cod's only water park", is a family-owned water park located in East Wareham, Massachusetts and attracting about 100,000 visitors yearly. This park is not to be confused with Water Wizz in Westerly, Rhode Island, as the two are separately owned.

History
The park opened in 1982, with 3 serpentine slides and 2 speed slides. The serpentine slides are Hurricane Floyd, Hurricane Bob, and Hurricane Carol, and the speed slides are Hurricane Andrew and Hurricane Hugo. The 5 slides make up Hurricane Hill. In 1984, the park added bumper boats and an 18-hole mini-golf course but they didn't last long. Cartland of Cape Cod now holds the mini golf course and bumper boats at their location right down the road from Water Wizz. In 1989, the park added its first tube ride, The Canal, and a lazy river, Herring Run River. In 1993, a lily pad walk and kiddie pool was added, named Harpoon Lagoon, and speed slide Pirates Plunge was added as well. Devils Peak, later renamed to Squid Row was added in 1995, which are 2 speed slides that use a tube. The Mussel Beach Wave Pool was added in 2000, and Captain Kids Island was added in 2008. In 2013, 3 tube slides, named Thunder Falls after the park they came from, were relocated to Water Wizz.  The other slides are 2 speed slides that are 61 feet tall, named Devils Peak. The slides took the name from 2 other slides at Water Wizz, which are now renamed to Squid Row. In 2019, one of the park's managers announced plans to expand.

Popular culture
Water Wizz was used as a location for two consecutive scenes in the 2010 film Grown Ups. The park also appeared by name and playing a larger part in the 2013 film The Way, Way Back.

References

External links
Official website
Water Wizz on Ultimate Waterpark.com

Buildings and structures in Wareham, Massachusetts
Water parks in Massachusetts
Tourist attractions in Plymouth County, Massachusetts